Kiani may refer to:
Kiani (surname)
 Kiani, a supporting character of Fathom (comics)
Kiani Crown, a coronation crown used during the Qajar dynasty (1796–1925)
Kyani, a settlement in Didymoteicho, Greece